Cristina Martinez is an American rock singer. She is best known as the lead singer of Boss Hog. She has also been a member of Pussy Galore and The Honeymoon Killers. Her husband, guitarist Jon Spencer, collaborated with her in all three bands. Her music has included elements of blues, grunge, noise rock and new wave. She has been referred to as a sex symbol, and has appeared nude on album covers and in concert.

References

Living people
American women rock singers
Pussy Galore (band) members
Year of birth missing (living people)
21st-century American women